The endurance running hypothesis is a series of conjectures which presume humans evolved anatomical and physiological adaptations to run long distances 
and, more strongly, that "running is the only known behavior that would account for the different body plans in Homo as opposed to apes or australopithecines".

The hypothesis proposes that endurance running played an important role in enabling early hominins to obtain meat. The promoters of the hypothesis have suggested that endurance running would help hominins compete for animal carcasses or even with persistence hunting.

The way we move
"… no animal walks or runs as we do. We keep the trunk erect; in walking, our knees are almost straight at mid-stance; the forces our feet exert on the ground are very markedly two-peaked when we walk fast; and in walking and usually in running we strike the ground initially with the heel alone. No animal walks or runs like that."

Endurance running hypothesis

Premise
Australopithecus had structural adaptations for upright walking and running that are essentially those of modern humans.

Human running was thought to be less efficient than predicted for mammals of similar mass and yet humans are capable distance runners, which seemed to be a paradox as some modern hunters apparently run prey animals to exhaustion. However in more recent analyses, although 25% lower than predicted for human walking and 27% higher than predicted for human running, there was no statistically significant difference in cost compared to other mammals.

The efficiency of human running was thought not to change with running speed, so human hunters would be able to chase at running speeds that were not optimal for the quadrupedal prey. However more recent analysis shows that individual humans do have optimal running speeds; they are less efficient when running faster or slower than their optimal speed.

The basic capacity for heat dissipation through sweating and hairlessness may be a primitive trait for Old World anthropoids, which enables endurance.

Human skeletal muscle was thought not to be unusual. However more recent analysis shows unexpected metabolic changes in human muscle that seem to be linked to a drastic reduction in muscle strength compared to chimpanzees and macaque monkeys.

The relative inefficiency of human running must have been overcome, because humans are relatively good endurance runners. (More recent analyses shows no statistically significant difference in efficiency to overcome).

Hypothesis
That the efficiency constraint was overcome, suggests that at some point in the evolution of hominins there was strong selective pressure for "endurance running" — running many kilometers, running for hours, during the heat of the day — until faster prey could endure no more. (More recent analyses shows no statistically significant difference in efficiency to overcome).

Something-like persistence hunting by hominins created selective pressure for adaptations that improved "endurance running".

Response
The comments presented with the article make straight-forward objections — "… it is not necessary to postulate endurance running as the cause of increased heat load in early hominins. Activities related to short-range hunting and scavenging in the open during the hottest part of the day seem to me sufficient. … simply unnecessary…"

Endurance running hypothesis revisited

Premise 
Australopithecus did not have structural adaptations for running. Selection for anatomical features that made "endurance running" possible radically transformed the hominin body.

Compared to Australopithecus fossil skeletons, selection for walking by-itself would not develop some-of these proposed "endurance running" derived traits —
 evaporative heat dissipation from the scalp and face prevents hyperthermia
 flatter face makes the head more balanced
 Nuchal ligament helps counterbalance the head
 shoulders and body can rotate without rotating the head
 taller body has more skin surface for evaporative heat dissipation
 torso can counter rotate to balance rotation of the hindlimbs
 shorter forearms make it easier to counter balance hindlimbs
 shorter forearms cost less to keep flexed
 backbones are wider which will absorb more impact
 stronger backbone pelvis connection will absorb more impact
 compared to modern apes human buttocks "are huge" and "critical for stabilization"
 longer hindlimbs
 Achilles tendon springs conserve energy
 lighter tendons efficiently replace lower limb muscles
 broader hindlimb joints will absorb more impact
 foot bones create a stiff arch for efficient push off 
 broader heel bone will absorb more impact
 shorter toes and an aligned big toe provide better push off

Hypotheses
There was strong selective pressure for "endurance running" — running many kilometers, running for hours — from persistence hunting until faster prey could endure no more.

There was strong selective pressure for "endurance running" — running fewer kilometers, running less time — to reach nearby carcasses faster than other scavengers and hominins.

Response
The derived longer hindlimb was already present in Australopithecus along with evidence for foot bones with a stiff arch. Walking and running in Australopithecus may have been essentially the same as early Homo. Small changes in joint morphology may indicate neutral evolutionary processes rather than selection.

The methodology by which the proposed derived traits were chosen and evaluated does not seem to have been stated, and there were immediate highly technical arguments "dismissing their validity and terming them either trivial or incorrect."

The majority of those proposed traits have not been tested for their effect on walking and running efficiency. The new trunk shape counter-rotations, which help control rotations induced by hip-joint motion, do seem to be active during walking. Elastic energy storage does occur in the plantar soft tissue of the foot during walking.
Relative lower-limb length has a slightly larger effect on the economy of walking than running.
The heel-down foot posture makes walking economical but does not benefit running.

Model-based analysis showing that scavengers would reach a carcass within 30 minutes of detection suggests that "endurance running" would not have given earlier access to carcasses, and so not result in selection for "endurance running". Earlier access to carcasses may have selected for running short distances of 5 km or less, with adaptations that improved running performance more generally.

Discovery of more fossil evidence resulted in additional detailed descriptions of hindlimb bones with measurable data being reported in the literature. From study of those reports, hindlimb proposed traits were already present in Australopithecus or early Homo. Those hindlimb characteristics most likely evolved to improve walking efficiency with improved running as a by-product.

Attracting publicity
Media reports in 2004 mostly reflected the official news release, plus thoroughly hyped "Humans were born to run, scientists say" sound bites from interviews.
 

The hype reached celebrity level in 2009 when the hypothesis was promoted in the book Born to Run.

Sound bites may not be as definitive as they sound —

"Your butt is a running muscle…"
“Your butt is a running muscle; you barely use it when you walk,” Dr. Lieberman said.

The supposition that large muscle size or increased muscle activity during a task indicates selective pressure, has prompted several experiments using electromyography with human subjects. On the other hand, relatively consistent muscle activity might indicate efficient habitually practiced movement.

 When differences in gluteus maximus activity during walking versus running were examined, the muscle was considerably more active during treadmill running than walking, although the results did not show that the gluteus maximus has no functional role during walking and activity increased with speed.
 Muscle activity of seven thigh and hip muscle groups was measured during walking and running across a wide range of speeds and inclines. Whether walking had more gluteus maximus activity than running, changed between the lowest treadmill incline and the highest; when speed was held constant. The increases in gluteus maximus activity with incline walking and running were similar. The results do not appear to support the hypothesis that the large size of the human gluteus maximus has been particularly selected for "endurance running".
 Gluteus maximus activity was much greater in sprinting than in running, similar in climbing and running, and greater in running than walking. Increased muscle activity seems related to the speed and intensity of the movement rather than the gait itself. The data suggests that the large size of the gluteus maximus reflects multiple roles during rapid and powerful movements rather than a specific adaptation to submaximal "endurance running".

 Gluteus maximus activity was substantially higher in maximal effort jumping and punching than sprinting, and substantially higher in sprinting than in running at speeds that can be sustained. The activity levels are not consistent with the suggestion that the muscle size is a result of selection for sustained "endurance running".

"…walking won't do that, but running will…"

"There were 2.5 million to 3 million years of bipedal walking without ever looking like a human, so is walking going to be what suddenly transforms the hominid body?" said Bramble. "We're saying 'no, walking won't do that, but running will.' " 

Others say changes in body proportions between Australopithecus and Homo erectus can be explained as adaptations to load-carrying and long-distance walking.

In any case, many features proposed as derived traits in Homo are already seen in Australopithecus which diminishes the sudden transformation.

"No Olympic sprinter could ever outrun a lion."

"No Olympic sprinter could ever outrun a lion. We humans gave up the ability to run fast by mammalian standards many millions of years ago when we became bipeds and lost the ability to gallop. " 

"…one need not outrun a fast predator, but rather, merely not be the slowest individual trying to flee." Sprinting may be selected for because the potential benefit is so large.

"No horse or dog could possibly…"
"… humans are the sole species of mammal that excels at long distance trekking and running in extremely hot conditions. No horse or dog could possibly run a marathon in 30◦C heat."
Comparison from long distance Man vs. Horse races shows that on hotter days, the race performance of horses worsens more than that-of humans. Yet even on hotter days, even while carrying a human rider, the horses typically run more quickly. As a matter of fact, there do seem to be examples of dogs running marathon distances in desert heat.

Conclusion
Although some of the proposed adaptations may be related to long distance running, the human ability to run long distances is mostly due to increased hindlimb muscle size and changes to muscle physiology. It remains unclear when and how that may have taken place.

References

Human evolution
Hypotheses
Running
Biological hypotheses